The Normanskill Formation is a geologic formation in New York. It preserves fossils dating back to the Ordovician period.

See also

 List of fossiliferous stratigraphic units in New York

References
 
 Normanskill Formation (NYOn;3)on USGS

Ordovician geology of New York (state)
Ordovician southern paleotemperate deposits